New Mexico was admitted to the Union on January 6, 1912 and elects members of the United States Senate who belong to Class 1 and Class 2. The state's current U.S. senators are Democrats Martin Heinrich (since 2013) and Ben Ray Luján (since 2021). Pete Domenici was New Mexico's longest-serving senator (1973–2009).

List of senators 

|- style="height:2em"
| colspan=3 | Vacant
| nowrap | Jan 6, 1912 –Mar 27, 1912
| New Mexico became a state January 6, 1912 but didn't elect its U.S. senators until March 27.
| rowspan=4 | 1
| rowspan=2 
| rowspan=2 | 1
| New Mexico became a state January 6, 1912 but didn't elect its U.S. senators until March 27.
| nowrap | Jan 6, 1912 –Mar 27, 1912
| colspan=3 | Vacant

|- style="height:2em"
! rowspan=3 | 1
| rowspan=3 align=left | Thomas B. Catron
| rowspan=3  | Republican
| rowspan=3 nowrap | Mar 27, 1912 –Mar 3, 1917
| rowspan=3 | Elected in 1912.Retired.
| Elected in 1912.
| rowspan=5 nowrap  | Mar 27, 1912 –Mar 3, 1921
| rowspan=5  | Republican
| rowspan=5 align=right | Albert B. Fall
! rowspan=5 | 1

|- style="height:2em"
| 
| rowspan=3 | 2
| rowspan=3 | Elected in 1912 to next term, but Legislature invalided that election.Elected in 1913 to next term.

|- style="height:2em"
| 

|- style="height:2em"
! rowspan=7 | 2
| rowspan=7 align=left | Andrieus A. Jones
| rowspan=7  | Democratic
| rowspan=7 nowrap  | Mar 4, 1917 –Dec 20, 1927
| rowspan=4 | Elected in 1916.
| rowspan=4 | 2
| 

|- style="height:2em"
| 
| rowspan=4 | 3
| Re-elected in 1918.Resigned to become U.S. Secretary of the Interior.

|- style="height:2em"
| rowspan=2 
|  
| nowrap | Mar 4, 1921 –Mar 11, 1921
| colspan=3 | Vacant

|- style="height:2em"
| rowspan=2 | Appointed to continue Fall's term.Elected in 1921 to finish Fall's term.Lost re-election.
| rowspan=2 nowrap | Mar 11, 1921 –Mar 3, 1925
| rowspan=2  | Republican
| rowspan=2 align=right | Holm O. Bursum
! rowspan=2 | 2

|- style="height:2em"
| rowspan=3 | Re-elected in 1922.Died.
| rowspan=6 | 3
| 

|- style="height:2em"
| 
| rowspan=6 | 4
| rowspan=6 | Elected in 1924.
| rowspan=8 nowrap  | Mar 4, 1925 –Jun 24, 1933
| rowspan=8  | Democratic
| rowspan=8 align=right | Sam G. Bratton
! rowspan=8 | 3

|- style="height:2em"
| rowspan=4 

|- style="height:2em"
| colspan=3 | Vacant
| nowrap | Dec 20, 1927 –Dec 29, 1927
|  

|- style="height:2em"
! 3
| align=left | Bronson M. Cutting
|  | Republican
| nowrap | Dec 29, 1927 –Dec 6, 1928
| Appointed to continue Jones's term.Retired when elected successor qualified.

|- style="height:2em"
! 4
| align=left | Octaviano Larrazolo
|  | Republican
| nowrap | Dec 7, 1928 –Mar 3, 1929
| Elected in 1928 to finish Jones's term.Retired due to illness.

|- style="height:2em"
! rowspan=6 | 5
| rowspan=6 align=left | Bronson M. Cutting
| rowspan=6  | Republican
| rowspan=6 nowrap  | Mar 4, 1929 –May 6, 1935
| rowspan=5 | Elected in 1928.
| rowspan=5 | 4
| 

|- style="height:2em"
| 
| rowspan=7 | 5
| rowspan=2 | Re-elected in 1930.Resigned to become a judge of the U.S. Court of Appeals.

|- style="height:2em"
| rowspan=3 

|- style="height:2em"
|  
| nowrap | Jun 24, 1933 –Oct 10, 1933
| colspan=3 | Vacant

|- style="height:2em"
| rowspan=4 | Appointed to continue Bratton's termElected in 1934 to finish Bratton's term.
| rowspan=10 nowrap  | Oct 10, 1933 –Jan 3, 1949
| rowspan=10  | Democratic
| rowspan=10 align=right | Carl Hatch
! rowspan=10 | 4

|- style="height:2em"
| Re-elected in 1934.Died.
| rowspan=5 | 5
| rowspan=3 

|- style="height:2em"
| colspan=3 | Vacant
| nowrap | May 6, 1935 –May 11, 1935
|  

|- style="height:2em"
! rowspan=14 | 6
| rowspan=14 align=left | Dennis Chávez
| rowspan=14  | Democratic
| rowspan=14 nowrap  | May 11, 1935 –Nov 18, 1962
| rowspan=3 | Appointed to continue Cutting's term.Elected in 1936 to finish Cutting's term.

|- style="height:2em"
| 
| rowspan=3 | 6
| rowspan=3 | Re-elected in 1936.

|- style="height:2em"
| 

|- style="height:2em"
| rowspan=3 | Re-elected in 1940.
| rowspan=3 | 6
| 

|- style="height:2em"
| 
| rowspan=3 | 7
| rowspan=3 | Re-elected in 1942.Retired.

|- style="height:2em"
| 

|- style="height:2em"
| rowspan=3 | Re-elected in 1946.
| rowspan=3 | 7
| 

|- style="height:2em"
| 
| rowspan=3 | 8
| rowspan=3 | Elected in 1948.
| rowspan=15 nowrap  | Jan 3, 1949 –Jan 3, 1973
| rowspan=15  | Democratic
| rowspan=15 align=right | Clinton Anderson
! rowspan=15 | 5

|- style="height:2em"
| 

|- style="height:2em"
| rowspan=3 | Re-elected in 1952.
| rowspan=3 | 8
| 

|- style="height:2em"
| 
| rowspan=3 | 9
| rowspan=3 | Re-elected in 1954.

|- style="height:2em"
| 

|- style="height:2em"
| rowspan=2 | Re-elected in 1958.Died.
| rowspan=6 | 9
| 

|- style="height:2em"
| rowspan=3 
| rowspan=6 | 10
| rowspan=6 | Re-elected in 1960.

|- style="height:2em"
| colspan=3 | Vacant
| nowrap | Nov 18, 1962 –Nov 30, 1962
|  

|- style="height:2em"
! rowspan=2 | 7
| rowspan=2 align=left | Edwin L. Mechem
| rowspan=2  | Republican
| rowspan=2 nowrap | Nov 30, 1962 –Nov 3, 1964
| rowspan=2 | Self-appointed  to continue Chávez's term.Lost election to finish Chávez's term.

|- style="height:2em"
| rowspan=2 

|- style="height:2em"
! rowspan=7 | 8
| rowspan=7 align=left | Joseph Montoya
| rowspan=7  | Democratic
| rowspan=7 nowrap  | Nov 4, 1964 –Jan 3, 1977
| Elected in 1964 to finish Chávez's term.

|- style="height:2em"
| rowspan=3 | Re-elected in 1964.
| rowspan=3 | 10
| 

|- style="height:2em"
| 
| rowspan=3 | 11
| rowspan=3 | Re-elected in 1966.Retired.

|- style="height:2em"
| 

|- style="height:2em"
| rowspan=3 | Re-elected in 1970.Lost re-election.
| rowspan=3 | 11
| 

|- style="height:2em"
| 
| rowspan=3 | 12
| rowspan=3 | Elected in 1972.
| rowspan=18 nowrap  | Jan 3, 1973 –Jan 3, 2009
| rowspan=18  | Republican
| rowspan=18 align=right | Pete Domenici
! rowspan=18 | 6

|- style="height:2em"
| 

|- style="height:2em"
! rowspan=3 | 9
| rowspan=3 align=left | Harrison Schmitt
| rowspan=3  | Republican
| rowspan=3 nowrap | Jan 3, 1977 –Jan 3, 1983
| rowspan=3 | Elected in 1976.Lost re-election.
| rowspan=3 | 12
| 

|- style="height:2em"
| 
| rowspan=3 | 13
| rowspan=3 | Re-elected in 1978.

|- style="height:2em"
| 

|- style="height:2em"
! rowspan=15 | 10
| rowspan=15 align=left | Jeff Bingaman
| rowspan=15  | Democratic
| rowspan=15 nowrap  | Jan 3, 1983 –Jan 3, 2013
| rowspan=3 | Elected in 1982.
| rowspan=3 | 13
| 

|- style="height:2em"
| 
| rowspan=3 | 14
| rowspan=3 | Re-elected in 1984.

|- style="height:2em"
| 

|- style="height:2em"
| rowspan=3 | Re-elected in 1988.
| rowspan=3 | 14
| 

|- style="height:2em"
| 
| rowspan=3 | 15
| rowspan=3 | Re-elected in 1990.

|- style="height:2em"
| 

|- style="height:2em"
| rowspan=3 | Re-elected in 1994.
| rowspan=3 | 15
| 

|- style="height:2em"
| 
| rowspan=3 | 16
| rowspan=3 | Re-elected in 1996.

|- style="height:2em"
| 

|- style="height:2em"
| rowspan=3 | Re-elected in 2000.
| rowspan=3 | 16
| 

|- style="height:2em"
| 
| rowspan=3 | 17
| rowspan=3 | Re-elected in 2002.Retired.

|- style="height:2em"
| 

|- style="height:2em"
| rowspan=3 | Re-elected in 2006.Retired.
| rowspan=3 | 17
| 

|- style="height:2em"
| 
| rowspan=3 | 18
| rowspan=3 | Elected in 2008.
| rowspan=6 nowrap | Jan 3, 2009 –Jan 3, 2021
| rowspan=6  | Democratic
| rowspan=6 align=right | Tom Udall
! rowspan=6 | 7

|- style="height:2em"
| 

|- style="height:2em"
! rowspan=6 | 11
| rowspan=6 align=left | Martin Heinrich
| rowspan=6  | Democratic
| rowspan=6 nowrap  | Jan 3, 2013 –Present
| rowspan=3 | Elected in 2012.
| rowspan=3 | 18
| 

|- style="height:2em"
| 
| rowspan=3 | 19
| rowspan=3 | Re-elected in 2014.Retired.

|- style="height:2em"
| 

|- style="height:2em"
| rowspan=3 | Re-elected in 2018.
| rowspan=3 | 19
| 

|- style="height:2em"
| 
| rowspan=3 | 20
| rowspan=3 | Elected in 2020.
| rowspan=3 nowrap | Jan 3, 2021 –Present
| rowspan=3  | Democratic
| rowspan=3 align=right | Ben Ray Luján
! rowspan=3 | 8

|- style="height:2em"
| 

|- style="height:2em"
| rowspan=2 colspan=5 | To be determined in the 2024 election.
| rowspan=2|20
| 

|- style="height:2em"
| 
| 21
| colspan=5 | To be determined in the 2026 election.

See also 

List of United States representatives from New Mexico
United States congressional delegations from New Mexico
Elections in New Mexico

Notes

References 
Biographical Directory of the United States Congress
 

Politics of New Mexico
 
United States senators
New Mexico